The Lacus Iuturnae, or Lacus Juturnae or Spring of Juturna, is the name of a formal pool built by the Romans near a spring or well in the Roman Forum. The pool was part of a shrine dedicated to the water nymph Juturna, and the name Lacus Iuturnae is also used for the spring and the shrine, both next to the pool.

The site was initially excavated by Giacomo Boni in the early twentieth century. Excavations from the 1980s onwards were supervised by Eva Margareta Steinby.

Legends
The shrine marks a place where Roman legend claims the divine twins Castor and Pollux stopped to water their horses while passing through the city, and where they announced Roman victory at the Battle of Lake Regillus, 495 BC. During the Roman Empire, when another spring in the city had dried up, the Vestal Virgins used this spring to supply water for their religious ceremonies. The water at the Lacus Iuturnae was thought to have healing properties. The elderly and infirm would go to the spring with offerings in order to secure the assistance of Juturna in curing their malady.

References

External links
 James Grout: Lacus Juturnae, part of the Encyclopædia Romana

Ancient Roman religion
Ancient Roman buildings and structures in Rome
Roman Forum
Rome R. X Campitelli
Springs of Italy